The Ball State University Observatory is a collection of five permanently mounted telescopes on the Cooper Science Building on the campus of the Ball State University in Muncie, IN. Its largest telescope is a 16-inch Meade LX200. The observatory is used primarily for student astronomy classes and not research. The observatory also hosts public observation events for enthusiasts.

See also 
List of observatories

References

External links
 Ball State University Planetarium and Observatory

Observatory
Astronomical observatories in Indiana
Buildings and structures in Muncie, Indiana
Education in Delaware County, Indiana
Tourist attractions in Muncie, Indiana